Marc Christopher Gwynne Ellis (born 8 October 1971) is a New Zealand businessman, television presenter, and former rugby union and rugby league footballer who played in the 1990s and 2000s. A graduate of the University of Otago, his primary business interest was in Charlie's, a juice company. During the 1995 Rugby World Cup he scored six tries in the game against Japan, which is the record for the most tries by an individual in a Rugby World Cup match.

NPC

Ellis started out for Otago in the NPC in 1991 when he was playing for the club side University, and he was selected for the NZ Colts. He made a name for himself while playing for Otago, which earned him All Black selection in 1992. Ellis stayed with Otago until 1995 when he switched code to rugby league. In 1998, after two seasons of league, Ellis played for North Harbour in the NPC, where he remained for another two seasons. Ellis played his last season of NPC in 2000 for North Harbour.

All Blacks

Ellis first played for the All Blacks in 1992, against a South Australian Invitation XV, then against Australian club and invitation sides. He scored two tries in his first test, in 1993, at first five-eighth against Scotland, won 51–15 by the All Blacks. A week later he was selected for the test against England where he also played first five. Ellis played his last match of 1993 against the Barbarians. For the 1994 season, Ellis was not selected for the All Blacks and did not attend the NZ trial due to injury, but he did play for the New Zealand XV and New Zealand Universities sides. In 1995 Ellis was re-called to the All Blacks for the World Cup, playing five games on the wing. He scored seven tries in the tournament, six of them in the 145–17 win over Japan.

Rugby league
At the end of the 1995 season Ellis switched to league to play for the Auckland Warriors where he joined his All Blacks teammate John Kirwan. Ellis was Warrior number 29 when he played his first match in 1996. He played for the Warriors between 1996 and 1998, playing in 36 matches and scoring 103 points through 11 tries, 29 goals and 1 field goal. 
Ellis also represented the New Zealand national rugby league team, the Kiwis, in 5 matches.

Super 12
Ellis missed out on the first few seasons of the Super 12 due to his rugby league career, but when he returned to rugby union in 1998 it was only a short time before he was into the Super 12. After playing a solid season for North Harbour in the NPC Ellis was picked for the Blues, where he played one season. In 1999, after strong seasons with North Harbour and the Blues, Ellis was named in one of the early training squads for the 1999 Rugby World Cup, but he was not selected in the final team and played for NZ A instead. In 2000 Ellis played his final Super 12 season for the Highlanders before retiring from rugby.

Post playing career
In the early 2000s, Ellis was a popular figure on New Zealand television, often appearing alongside fellow former rugby union and league player Matthew Ridge, notably on light-hearted documentaries. In 2004, as part of a one such programme, Ellis took part in and won the famous and eccentric British annual event, the Cooper's Hill Cheese-Rolling and Wake.

From 1996 to 2005 Ellis was a regular presenter on the TV2 talk show SportsCafe, where he was known for his "larrikin" personality. In 2003 he inaugurated the mock public holiday "National Nude Day" by challenging viewers to streak in front of then Prime Minister Helen Clark.

In 2006, he released his autobiography Crossing the Line, which details all aspects of his life. Ellis has since co-authored Good Fullas: A Guide to Kiwi Blokes, released in 2010 with friend and New Zealand Consul General to Italy, Charlie Haddrell.

In 2010 the Gardens Tavern, then a popular student pub in North Dunedin, was advertised for sale; Ellis attempted to buy it but was outbid by the University of Otago, who converted it into a study centre. The university student magazine Critic alleges that the University bought it for the specific purpose of keeping it out of Ellis' hands.

Controversy
In 2005, Ellis purchased ecstasy tablets from a drug dealer who was under surveillance by the New Zealand Police. Ellis was among many high-profile figures caught in the operation, code-named Aqua. His court appearance put an end to a poorly-kept secret, as despite the fact he had originally obtained name suppression, his identity was widely known by the New Zealand public. Ellis was fined $300.

On 15 November 2007, as part of an elaborate marketing ploy for his latest business venture, Ellis detonated 600 kg of explosives on top of Rangitoto Island, a nature reserve in Auckland's Waitematā Harbour. This was an attempt to create an illusion that the volcanic island was erupting. The New Zealand Department of Conservation described the stunt as "demoralising and very disappointing". There is a total fire ban on the island because of ecological significance.

References

External links
Marc Ellis | Rugby Database Profile
Marc Ellis at rugbymuseum.co.nz
The Listener 2004 Power List: Ellis is listed as no. 49. Retrieved 27 August 2005.
Sports Comedy Shows and New Lad Culture in NZ. Retrieved 30 November 2006 from www.sportsfreak.co.nz.
Marc Ellis joins the Hare Krishnas New Zealand Herald- 27 May 2007
Vodafone Warriors 1995-2008 (Player Roster)
 
 Marc's bloke spotting - Sunday Star Times 15 August 2010
 goodfullas.co.nz
 Marc Ellis Good Fullas Marc Ellis And Charlie Hadd at nzwomansweekly.co.nz
Statistics at en.espn.co.uk

1971 births
Living people
Dual-code rugby internationals
Highlanders (rugby union) players
New Zealand businesspeople
New Zealand international rugby union players
New Zealand national rugby league team players
New Zealand naturists
New Zealand rugby league players
New Zealand rugby union players
New Zealand Warriors players
North Harbour rugby union players
Otago rugby union players
People educated at Wellington College (New Zealand)
Rugby league fullbacks
Rugby league players from Wellington City
Rugby league wingers
Rugby union players from Wellington City
Rugby union wings
Social nudity advocates
University of Otago alumni
People educated at Wellesley College, New Zealand